Seguam Island is a small volcanic island in the Andreanof Islands group in the Aleutian Islands of Alaska. The 2000 census reported a population of one person.

The island consists of several overlapping stratovolcanoes, and it contains two calderas each with central volcanic cones.  About 10 historical eruptions have been recorded since the late 18th century, the most recent in 1993.  All recent activity has occurred at Pyre Peak, the cone within the western caldera and the highest point on the island, and has produced explosive eruptions and basaltic lava flows.

References

Further reading
 
 Alaska Volcano Observatory: Seguam Island
 Seguam Island: Block 1083, Census Tract 1, Aleutians West Census Area, Alaska United States Census Bureau

Andreanof Islands
Islands of Alaska
Islands of Unorganized Borough, Alaska